Guillermo "Guille" Rubio Vergara (alternate spelling: Guillem) (born October 14, 1982 in Barcelona, Spain) is a Spanish professional basketball player for Covirán Granada of the LEB Oro.

Professional career
After playing 15 years in Spain, Rubio joined Koroivos Amaliadas of the Greek Basket League in 2014. He went on to average 11.3 points and 5.9 rebounds in 24 games with Koroivos. The following season, he moved to VEF Rīga, and he became the captain of the team.

On August 3, 2016, Rubio signed with Doukas of the Greek A2 League.

On July 26, 2018, Rubio signed with Covirán Granada of the LEB Oro.

Honors

With Bàsquet Manresa
LEB: (1)
2006–07

References

External links
Profile at ACB.com
Profile at FEB.es

1982 births
Spanish men's basketball players
Living people
Bàsquet Manresa players
BK VEF Rīga players
CB Estudiantes players
Baloncesto Málaga players
Real Betis Baloncesto players
CB Valladolid players
Doukas B.C. players
Fundación CB Granada players
Gipuzkoa Basket players
Koroivos B.C. players
Liga ACB players
Spanish expatriate sportspeople in Greece
Basketball players from Barcelona
CB Vic players
Power forwards (basketball)